Ancell is an extinct town in the northeast corner of Kelso Township, Scott County, in the U.S. state of Missouri. It was named for Pashal Ancell, a pioneer citizen, but was first known as Glenn. It is now part of Scott City. Scott City is a consolidation of the formerly separate towns of Fornfelt, Ancell and Illmo, Missouri. These towns arose in association with the building and operation of railroads that passed through the area and all incorporated around the same time. Fornfelt, then known as Edna, incorporated in 1905. Illmo, on the Missouri side of a bridge linking Illinois and Missouri, incorporated in 1906. Ancell, just to the west of Illmo, incorporated in 1907. In 1960, Ancell merged with Fornfelt and formed Scott City. Illmo merged into Scott City in 1980. A post office called Ancell was established in 1912 and remained in operation until this merger. Ancell Cemetery is 5 miles south of Scott City.

References

Ghost towns in Missouri
Former populated places in Scott County, Missouri